The 2008 Cleveland Indians season marked the 108th season for the franchise, as the Indians attempted to defend their American League Central division title. The team played all of its home games at Progressive Field (formerly known as Jacobs Field).

2008 was the final year that the Indians held spring training in Winter Haven, Florida, at Chain of Lakes Park.  In 2009 the Indians would return to train in Goodyear, Arizona for the first time in 15 years at the new Goodyear Ballpark.

The Indians approached the winter of 2007–2008 with the idea that tinkering at the edges was what was primarily needed to build on the previous year.  Acquired in the offseason were utility infielder Jamey Carroll, Japanese League reliever Masahide Kobayashi and reliever Jorge Julio.

Regular season

Season summary

March

The Indians ended spring training in March with only one surprise, cutting veteran reliever Aaron Fultz in favor of pick up Craig Breslow (who was cut by the Boston Red Sox). Notable contributors from 2007 to start the year in Buffalo instead of Cleveland were Aaron Laffey, Ben Francisco,  Josh Barfield, and Tom Mastny. The Indians opened the regular season with a 10–8 win over the Chicago White Sox.

April
The victory in the home opener came with a price: an injury to catcher Victor Martinez.  While the offense played well enough to win the opening series, Martinez's missing bat did not help the Indians on their west coast road trip, where they lost series with both the Oakland Athletics and the Los Angeles Angels of Anaheim.  Martinez returned to play for the Angels series.  The Indians offense continued to struggle as the team failed to win their next four series.  Near the end of the month, the Indians swept the Kansas City Royals split a four-game series against the New York Yankees and appeared to be coming out of their slump.  Starting pitcher Cliff Lee was named American League Pitcher of the Month for April, as he finished the month 5–0 with a 0.96 ERA.

May
The sub par offense became such a concern that on May 5, in an attempt to spark more offense, Jason Michaels was designated for assignment and Ben Francisco, the 2007 International League batting champion was called up to play outfield.  For the first half of the month, the starting pitching was outstanding, resulting in a 43 scoreless innings streak  But the hitting still hadn't turned a corner and by the end of the month the Indians were still sub .500.  Making his Indians debut was highly touted but often injured first baseman Michael Aubrey.  The Indians swapped injured starting pitchers as Jake Westbrook came off the disabled list from an intercostal muscle injury just after Fausto Carmona went on it with a hip injury.  And to end the month, Travis Hafner was also placed on the disabled list with shoulder soreness.

June
Westbrook's return was brief, returning to the disabled list with season ending Tommy John surgery.  Victor Martinez also went on the disabled list with elbow problems.  And Josh Barfield, called up to replace the slumping Asdrúbal Cabrera, also went on the disabled list.  The Indians were one of the few AL clubs not to take great advantage of interleague play, going only 6–12 against the National League.

July
After plummeting to last place to start the month, the Indians threw in the towel on the season, trading CC Sabathia to the Milwaukee Brewers for outfielder Matt LaPorta, pitchers Rob Bryson and Zach Jackson and a player to be named later.  They also parted ways with Joe Borowski, first designating him for assignment then releasing him.  Although the Indians continued to struggle, pitcher Cliff Lee and center fielder Grady Sizemore were recognized for their individual accomplishments by being named to the American League All Star team.  Lee was named the starting pitcher for the American League squad, where he pitched two shutout innings.  Sizemore also participated in the Home Run Derby; he hit six home runs in the opening round, but it was not enough for him to advance to the second round.  The Indians swept a series against the league leading Tampa Bay Rays right before the All-Star break, but continued their relatively uneven play, even with the return of Fausto Carmona in late July.  Another victim of the Indians mediocre performance was Casey Blake, who was dealt to the Los Angeles Dodgers for Jon Meloan and baseball player Carlos Santana.

August
The Indians continued to struggle through the first week of August. On a road trip to start the month, the team began 2–4 before sweeping the Toronto Blue Jays at the Rogers Centre to finish the road trip 5–4 – the team's first winning road trip since May.  The sweep of Toronto began a streak in which the Indians won 16 of 19 games, including 10 in a row to climb into third place in the division.  The team clinched its first winning month of the season on August 24.  Despite the turnaround, the Indians continued to trade players in order to add depth to their farm system.  On August 12, they traded veteran pitcher Paul Byrd to the Boston Red Sox for a player to be named later.  Again, one of the Indians bright spots was the play of Cliff Lee, who was named the American League Pitcher of the Month for August.

September
The Indians had a significant impact on the division championship this month, in as much as they both slowed the Minnesota Twins from catching the Chicago White Sox and then gave the Twins a chance to win the division outright by beating the Sox two games out of three in the final series.  The Twins' losses to Kansas City at the same time, however, forced the White Sox to make up a game against the Detroit Tigers to help decide the division winner.  Cliff Lee's spectacular season ended with him having the American League lead in wins and ERA.  This effort earned Lee the American League Comeback Player of the Year award and the American League Cy Young Award.  Shin-Soo Choo's great September numbers earned him the American League Player of the Month.

Season standings

Game log

|-  style="text-align:center; background:#bfb;"
| 1 || March 31 || White Sox || 10–8 || Betancourt (1–0) || Dotel (0–1) || Borowski (1) || 41,872 || 1–0
|-  style="text-align:center; background:#bfb;"
| 2 || April 2 || White Sox || 7–2 || Carmona (1–0) || Vázquez (0–1) || || 17,645 || 2–0
|-  style="text-align:center; background:#fbb;"
| 3 || April 3 || White Sox || 2–1  || Dotel (1–1) || Westbrook (0–1) || Jenks (1) || 15,785  || 2–1
|-  style="text-align:center; background:#fbb;"
| 4 || April 4 || @ Athletics || 6–3 || Duchscherer (1–0) || Byrd (0–1) || || 13,916 || 2–2
|-  style="text-align:center; background:#fbb;"
| 5 || April 5 || @ Athletics || 6–1 || Eveland (1–0) || Sabathia (0–1) || || 16,279 || 2–3
|-  style="text-align:center; background:#bfb;"
| 6 || April 6 || @ Athletics || 2–1 || Lee (1–0) || Blanton (0–2) || Borowski (2) || 16,384 || 3–3
|-  style="text-align:center; background:#fbb;"
| 7 || April 7 || @ Angels || 6–4 || Shields (1–0) || Borowski (0–1) || || 35,014 || 3–4
|-  style="text-align:center; background:#bfb;"
| 8 || April 8 || @ Angels || 4–3 || Westbrook (1–1) || Speier (0–1) || || 37,587 || 4–4
|-  style="text-align:center; background:#fbb;"
| 9 || April 9 || @ Angels || 9–5 || Moseley (1–1) || Byrd (0–2) || || 36,168 || 4–5
|-  style="text-align:center; background:#fbb;"
| 10 || April 11 || Athletics || 9–7 || Blanton (1–2) || Sabathia (0–2) || Street (3) || 17,859 || 4–6
|-  style="text-align:center; background:#fbb;"
| 11 || April 12 || Athletics || 7–3 || DiNardo (1–0) || Carmona (1–1) || ||  19,170 || 4–7
|-  style="text-align:center; background:#bfb;"
| 12 || April 13 || Athletics || 7–1 || Lee (2–0) || Gaudin (0–1) || || 17,228 || 5–7
|-  style="text-align:center; background:#fbb;"
| 13 || April 14 || Red Sox || 6–4 || Timlin (1–1) || Borowski (0–2) || Papelbon (5) || 21,802 || 5–8
|-  style="text-align:center; background:#fbb;"
| 14 || April 15 || Red Sox || 5–3 || Aardsma (1–1) || Lewis (0–1)  || Okajima (1) || 25,135 || 5–9
|-  style="text-align:center; background:#fbb;"
| 15 || April 16 || Tigers || 13–2 || Galarraga (1–0) || Sabathia (0–3) || || 17,644 || 5–10
|-  style="text-align:center; background:#bfb;"
| 16 || April 17 || Tigers || 11–1 || Carmona (2–1) || Verlander (0–3) || || 21,547 || 6–10
|-  style="text-align:center; background:#bfb;"
| 17 || April 18 || @ Twins || 4–0 || Lee (3–0) || Liriano (0–2) || || 22,366 || 7–10
|-  style="text-align:center; background:#fbb;"
| 18 || April 19 || @ Twins || 3–0 || Blackburn (1–1) || Westbrook (1–2) || Nathan (6) || 34,210 || 7–11
|-  style="text-align:center; background:#fbb;"
| 19 || April 20 || @ Twins || 2 – 1 (10) || Guerrier (1–1) || Pérez (0–1) || || 27,703 || 7–12
|-  style="text-align:center; background:#bfb;"
| 20 || April 22 || @ Royals || 15–1 || Sabathia (1–3) || Meche (1–3) || || 16,165 || 8–12
|-  style="text-align:center; background:#bbb;"
| – || April 23 || @ Royals || colspan=6|Postponed (rain)  Rescheduled for April 24
|-  style="text-align:center; background:#bfb;"
| 21 || April 24 || @ Royals || 9–6 || Carmona (3–1) || Tomko (1–3) || Betancourt (1) || 11,637 || 9–12
|-  style="text-align:center; background:#bfb;"
| 22 || April 24 || @ Royals || 2–0|| Lee (4–0) || Bannister (3–2) || || 11,637 || 10–12
|-  style="text-align:center; background:#bfb;"
| 23 || April 25 || Yankees || 6–4 || Byrd (1–2) || Pettitte (3–2) || Betancourt (2) || 31,467 || 11–12
|-  style="text-align:center; background:#bfb;"
| 24 || April 26 || Yankees || 4–3 || Kobayashi (1–0) || Ohlendorf (0–1) || || 35,765 || 12–12
|-  style="text-align:center; background:#fbb;"
| 25 || April 27 || Yankees || 1–0 || Wang (5–0) || Sabathia (1–4) || Rivera (7) || 31,598 || 12–13
|-  style="text-align:center; background:#fbb;"
| 26 || April 28 || Yankees || 5–2 || Mussina (3–3) || Laffey (0–1) || Rivera (8) || 20,689 || 12–14
|-  style="text-align:center; background:#fbb;"
| 27 || April 29 || Mariners || 7–2 || Lowe (1–1) || Betancourt (1–1) || || 13,827 || 12–15
|-  style="text-align:center; background:#bfb;"
| 28 || April 30 || Mariners || 8–3 || Lee (5–0)  || Washburn (1–4) || || 15,279 || 13–15
|-

|-  style="text-align:center; background:#bfb;"
| 29 || May 1 || Mariners || 3 – 2 (11)|| Kobayashi (2–0) || Green (1–2) || || 15,722 || 14–15
|-  style="text-align:center; background:#bbb;"
| – || May 2 || Royals || colspan=6|Postponed (rain)  Rescheduled for September 13
|-  style="text-align:center; background:#fbb;"
| 30 || May 3 || Royals || 4–2 || Hochevar (2–1) || Sabathia (1–5) || Soria (7) || 27,272 || 14–16
|-  style="text-align:center; background:#fbb;"
| 31 || May 4 || Royals || 2–0 || Meche (2–4) || Laffey (0–2) || |Soria (8) || 27,836 || 14–17
|-  style="text-align:center; background:#bfb;"
| 32 || May 6 || @ Yankees || 5–3 || Pérez (1–1) || Chamberlain (1–2) || Betancourt (3) ||  50,713 || 15–17
|-  style="text-align:center; background:#bfb;"
| 33 || May 7 || @ Yankees || 3–0 || Lee (6–0) || Wang (6–1) || Betancourt (4) ||  50,199 || 16–17
|-  style="text-align:center; background:#fbb;"
| 34 || May 8 || @ Yankees || 6–3  || Mussina (5–3) || Byrd (1–3) || Rivera (9) || 53,227 || 16–18
|-  style="text-align:center; background:#bfb;"
| 35 || May 9 || Blue Jays || 6–1 || Sabathia (2–6) || Halladay (3–5) || || 26,472 || 17–18
|-  style="text-align:center; background:#bfb;"
| 36 || May 10 || Blue Jays || 12–0 || Laffey (1–2) || McGowan (2–3) || || 38,141 || 18–18
|-  style="text-align:center; background:#bbb;"
| – || May 11 || Blue Jays ||  colspan=6|Postponed (rain) Rescheduled for May 12
|-  style="text-align:center; background:#bfb;"
| 37 || May 12 || Blue Jays || 3–0 || Carmona (4–1) || Burnett (3–4) || || 16,045 || 19–18
|-  style="text-align:center; background:#fbb;"
| 38 || May 12 || Blue Jays || 3 – 0 (10)|| Ryan (1–0) || Betancourt (1–2) || Downs (4) || 16,045 || 19–19
|-  style="text-align:center; background:#bfb;"
| 39 || May 13 || Athletics || 4–0 || Byrd (2–3) || Duchscherer (3–2) || Kobayashi (1) || 16,974 || 20–19
|-  style="text-align:center; background:#bfb;"
| 40 || May 14 || Athletics || 2–0 || Sabathia (3–6) || Blanton (2–6) || || 18,188 || 21–19
|-  style="text-align:center; background:#bfb;"
| 41 || May 15 || Athletics || 4–2 || Laffey (2–2) || Smith (2–3) || Kobayashi (2) || 26,764 || 22–19
|-  style="text-align:center; background:#fbb;"
| 42 || May 16 || @ Reds || 4–3 || Weathers (1–2) || Lewis (0–2) || Cordero (8) || 33,433 || 22–20
|-  style="text-align:center; background:#fbb;"
| 43 || May 17 || @ Reds || 4–2 || Bray (1–0) || Kobayashi (2–1) || || 42,023 || 22–21
|-  style="text-align:center; background:#fbb;"
| 44 || May 18 || @ Reds || 6–4 || Vólquez (7–1) || Lee (6–1) || Cordero (9)  || 34,612 || 22–22
|-  style="text-align:center; background:#fbb;"
| 45 || May 20 || @ White Sox || 4–1 || Contreras (5–3) || Sabathia (3–6) || Jenks (11) || 27,533 || 22–23
|-  style="text-align:center; background:#fbb;"
| 46 || May 21 || @ White Sox || 7–2 || Vázquez (5–3) || Byrd (2–4) || || 38,518 || 22–24
|-  style="text-align:center; background:#fbb;"
| 47 || May 22 || @ White Sox || 3–1 || Linebrink (1–0) || Laffey (2–3) || Jenks (12) || 28,040 || 22–25
|-  style="text-align:center; background:#fbb;"
| 48 || May 23 || Rangers || 13–9 || Loe (1–0) || Carmona (4–2) || || 39,947 || 22–26
|-  style="text-align:center; background:#bfb;"
| 49 || May 24 || Rangers || 5–2 || Lee (7–1) || Feldman (1–2) || Borowski (3) || 40,504 || 23–26
|-  style="text-align:center; background:#fbb;"
| 50 || May 25 || Rangers || 2 – 1 (10) || Wright (3–1) || Kobayashi (2–1) || Wilson (10) || 35,464 || 23–27
|-  style="text-align:center; background:#fbb;"
| 51 || May 26 || White Sox || 6 – 3 (12) || Logan (2–1) || Elarton (0–1) || Jenks (13) || 30,006 || 23–28
|-  style="text-align:center; background:#bfb;"
| 52 || May 27 || White Sox || 8–2 || Laffey (3–3) || Buehrle (2–6) || || 25,426 || 24–28
|-  style="text-align:center; background:#fbb;"
| 53 || May 28 || White Sox || 6–5 || Floyd (5–3) || Betancourt (1–3) || Jenks (14) || 31,740 || 24–29
|-  style="text-align:center; background:#bfb;"
| 54 || May 30 || @ Royals || 5–4 || Lee (8–1) || Tomko (2–7) || Borowski (4) || 25,243 || 25–29
|-  style="text-align:center; background:#fbb;"
| 55 || May 31 || @ Royals || 4–2 || Davies (1–0) || Sabathia (3–7) || Soria (12) || 23,923 || 25–30
|-

|-  style="text-align:center; background:#fbb;"
| 56 || June 1 || @ Royals || 6–1 || Bannister (5–6) || Byrd (2–5) || || 22,345 || 25–31
|-  style="text-align:center; background:#bfb;"
| 57 || June 2 || @ Rangers || 13–9 || Kobayashi (3–2) || Guardado (0–1) || || 17,247 || 26–31
|-  style="text-align:center; background:#fbb;"
| 58 || June 3 || @ Rangers || 12–7 || Francisco (1–1) || Mastny (0–1) || || 16,373 || 26–32
|-  style="text-align:center; background:#bfb;"
| 59 || June 4 || @ Rangers || 15–9 || Lee (9–1) || Ramírez (0–1) || || 19,676 || 27–32
|-  style="text-align:center; background:#fbb;"
| 60 || June 5 || @ Rangers || 9–4 || Millwood (4–3) || Sabathia (3–8) || || 17,795 || 27–33
|-  style="text-align:center; background:#bfb;"
| 61 || June 6 || @ Tigers || 4–2 || Byrd (3–5) || Verlander (2–9) || Borowski (5) || 40,990 || 28–33
|-  style="text-align:center; background:#fbb;"
| 62 || June 7 || @ Tigers || 8–4 || Miner (3–3) || Kobayashi (3–3) || Jones (9) || 42,193 || 28–34
|-  style="text-align:center; background:#fbb;"
| 63 || June 8 || @ Tigers || 5–2 || Galarraga (5–2) || Sowers (0–1) || Jones (10) || 39,941 || 28–35
|-  style="text-align:center; background:#bfb;"
| 64 || June 9 || @ Tigers || 8–2 || Lee (10–1) || Willis (0–1) || || 38,440 || 29–35
|-  style="text-align:center; background:#bfb;"
| 65 || June 10 || Twins || 1–0 || Sabathia (4–8) || Baker (2–1) || || 26,874 || 30–35
|-  style="text-align:center; background:#fbb;"
| 66 || June 11 || Twins || 8–5 || Blackburn (5–4) || Byrd (3–6) || Nathan (17) || 18,742 || 30–36
|-  style="text-align:center; background:#bfb;"
| 67 || June 12 || Twins || 12–2 || Laffey (4–3) || Hernández (6–4) || || 21,716 || 31–36
|-  style="text-align:center; background:#bfb;"
| 68 || June 13 || Padres || 9–5 || Betancourt (2–3) || Meredith (0–2) || Kobayashi (3) || 31,399 || 32–36
|-  style="text-align:center; background:#fbb;"
| 69 || June 14 || Padres || 8 – 3 (10) || Bell (4–3) || Mujica (0–1) || || 37,484 || 32–37
|-  style="text-align:center; background:#bfb;"
| 70 || June 15 || Padres || 7–3 || Sabathia (5–8) || Maddux (3–5) || || 33,017 || 33–37
|-  style="text-align:center; background:#fbb;"
| 71 || June 17 || @ Rockies || 10–2 || Reynolds (2–4) || Byrd (3–7) || || 28,146 || 33–38
|-  style="text-align:center; background:#fbb;"
| 72 || June 18 || @ Rockies || 4–2 || Francis (3–6) || Laffey (4–4) || Fuentes (12) || 28,339 || 33–39
|-  style="text-align:center; background:#fbb;"
| 73 || June 19 || @ Rockies || 6–3 || de la Rosa (2–3) || Sowers (0–2) || Fuentes (13) || 33,174 || 33–40
|-  style="text-align:center; background:#bfb;"
| 74 || June 20 || @ Dodgers || 6 – 4 (10) || Borowski (1–2) || Saito (3–3) || Kobayashi (4) || 50,667 || 34–40
|-  style="text-align:center; background:#bfb;"
| 75 || June 21 || @ Dodgers || 7 – 2 (11) || Kobayashi (4–3) || Wade (0–1) || || 45,036 || 35–40
|-  style="text-align:center; background:#fbb;"
| 76 || June 22 || @ Dodgers || 4–3 || Billingsley (6–7) || Byrd (3–8) || Saito (11) || 39,993 || 35–41
|-  style="text-align:center; background:#fbb;"
| 77 || June 24 || Giants || 3–2 || Sánchez (7–4) || Betancourt (2–4) || Wilson (20) || 29,024 || 35–42
|-  style="text-align:center; background:#fbb;"
| 78 || June 25 || Giants || 4–1 || Zito (3–11) || Sowers (0–3) || Wilson (21) || 25,654 || 35–43
|-  style="text-align:center; background:#bfb;"
| 79 || June 26 || Giants || 4–1 || Lee (11–1) || Cain (4–6) || Borowski (6) || 25,257 || 36–43
|-  style="text-align:center; background:#bfb;"
| 80 || June 27 || Reds || 6–0 || Sabathia (6–8) || Thompson (0–1) || || 34,844 || 37–43
|-  style="text-align:center; background:#fbb;"
| 81 || June 28 || Reds || 5–0 || Cueto (6–8) || Byrd (3–9) || || 39,506 || 37–44
|-  style="text-align:center; background:#fbb;"
| 82 || June 29 || Reds || 9–5 || Arroyo (5–7) || Laffey (4–5) || || 37,079 || 37–45
|-  style="text-align:center; background:#fbb;"
| 83 || June 30 || @ White Sox || 9–7 || Floyd (9–4) || Sowers (0–4) || Thornton (1) || 38,466 || 37–46
|-

|-  style="text-align:center; background:#fbb;"
| 84 || July 1 || @ White Sox || 3 – 2 (10) || Russell (1–0) || Borowski (1–3) || || 25,502 || 37–47
|-  style="text-align:center; background:#fbb;"
| 85 || July 2 || @ White Sox || 6 – 5 (10) || Russell (2–0) || Kobayashi (4–4) || || 23,522 || 37–48
|-  style="text-align:center; background:#fbb;"
| 86 || July 4 || @ Twins || 12–3 || Hernández (9–5) || Byrd (3–10) || || 22,634 || 37–49
|-  style="text-align:center; background:#fbb;"
| 87 || July 5 || @ Twins || 9–6 || Slowey (6–6) || Mastny (0–2) || Nathan (24) || 31,887 || 37–50
|-  style="text-align:center; background:#fbb;"
| 88 || July 6 || @ Twins || 4–3 || Perkins (5–2) || Lee (11–2) || Nathan (25) || 30,258 || 37–51
|-  style="text-align:center; background:#fbb;"
| 89 || July 8 || @ Tigers || 9–2 || Verlander (6–9) || Sowers (0–5) || || 40,443 || 37–52
|-  style="text-align:center; background:#fbb;"
| 90 || July 9 || @ Tigers || 8–6 || Jones (4–0) || Lewis (0–3) || || 41,062 || 37–53
|-  style="text-align:center; background:#bfb;"
| 91 || July 10 || Rays || 13–2 || Laffey (5–5) || Sonnanstine (10–4) || || 22,665 || 38–53
|-  style="text-align:center; background:#bfb;"
| 92 || July 11 || Rays || 5–0  || Lee (12–2) || Shields (7–6) ||  || 33,663  || 39–53
|-  style="text-align:center; background:#bfb;"
| 93 || July 12 || Rays || 8–4 || Ginter (1–0) || Garza (7–5) || || 35,706 || 40–53
|-  style="text-align:center; background:#bfb;"
| 94 || July 13 || Rays || 5–2  || Mastny (1–2)  || Kazmir (7–5)  || Kobayashi (5)  || 29,700 || 41–53
|-  style="text-align:center; background:#fbb;"
| 95 || July 18 || @ Mariners || 8–2 || Hernández (7–6) || Laffey (5–6) || || 42,570 || 41–54
|-  style="text-align:center; background:#bfb;"
| 96 || July 19 || @ Mariners || 9–6 || Sowers (1–5) || Batista (4–11) || || 37,869 || 42–54
|-  style="text-align:center; background:#bfb;"
| 97 || July 20 || @ Mariners || 6–2 || Lee (13–2) || Silva (4–12) || || 32,230 || 43–54
|-  style="text-align:center; background:#bfb;"
| 98 || July 21 || @ Angels || 5–2 || Byrd (4–10) || Santana (11–4) || Kobayashi (6) || 43,037 || 44–54
|-  style="text-align:center; background:#fbb;"
| 99 || July 22 || @ Angels || 3–2 || Oliver (4–1) || Ginter (1–1) || Rodríguez (41) || 43,505 || 44–55
|-  style="text-align:center; background:#fbb;"
| 100 || July 23 || @ Angels || 14–11 || Lackey (8–2) || Laffey (5–7) || Rodríguez (42) || 42,187 || 44–56
|-  style="text-align:center; background:#bfb;"
| 101 || July 25 || Twins || 5–4 || Lee (14–2) || Hernández (10–7) || Perez (1) || 33,512 || 45–56
|-  style="text-align:center; background:#fbb;"
| 102 || July 26 || Twins || 11–4 || Baker (7–3) || Carmona (4–3) || || 35,390 || 45–57
|-  style="text-align:center; background:#fbb;"
| 103 || July 27 || Twins || 4–2 || Guerrier (6–4) || Perez (1–2) || Nathan (28) || 31,562 || 45–58
|-  style="text-align:center; background:#bfb;"
| 104 || July 28 || Tigers || 5–0 || Byrd (5–10) || Rogers (8–7) || || 24,689 || 46–58
|-  style="text-align:center; background:#fbb;"
| 105 || July 29 || Tigers || 8–5 || Galarraga (9–4) || Ginter (1–2) || || 30,625 || 46–59
|-  style="text-align:center; background:#fbb;"
| 106 || July 30 || Tigers || 14 – 12 (13) || Fossum (2–0) || Rincón (0–1) || || 26,596 || 46–60
|-  style="text-align:center; background:#bfb;"
| 107 || July 31 || Tigers || 9–4 || Carmona (5–3) || Verlander (8–11) || || 34,186 || 47–60
|-

|-  style="text-align:center; background:#fbb;"
| 108 || August 1 || @ Twins || 4–1 || Blackburn (8–6) || Sowers (1–6) || Nathan (30) || 33,709 || 47–61
|-  style="text-align:center; background:#bfb;"
| 109 || August 2 || @ Twins || 5–1 || Byrd (6–10) || Slowey (7–8) || || 40,937 || 48–61
|-  style="text-align:center; background:#fbb;"
| 110 || August 3 || @ Twins || 6–2 || Liriano (1–3) || Ginter (1–3) || || 39,618 || 48–62
|-  style="text-align:center; background:#bfb;"
| 111 || August 4 || @ Rays || 5–2 || Lee (15–2) || Garza (9–7) || Perez (2) || 17,049 || 49–62
|-  style="text-align:center; background:#fbb;"
| 112 || August 5 || @ Rays || 8–4 || Jackson (8–7) || Carmona (5–4) || || 20,063 || 49–63
|-  style="text-align:center; background:#fbb;"
| 113 || August 6 || @ Rays || 10–7 || Percival (2–0) || Kobayashi (4–5) || || 27,533 || 49–64
|-  style="text-align:center; background:#bfb;"
| 114 || August 8 || @ Blue Jays || 5–2 || Reyes (1–0) || Purcey (1–3) || Lewis (1) || 31,627 || 50–64
|-  style="text-align:center; background:#bfb;"
| 115 || August 9 || @ Blue Jays || 4–2 || Byrd (7–10) || Halladay (13–9) || || 39,623 || 51–64
|-  style="text-align:center; background:#bfb;"
| 116 || August 10 || @ Blue Jays || 4–0 || Lee (16–2) || Richmond (0–2) || || 36,447 || 52–64
|-  style="text-align:center; background:#bfb;"
| 117 || August 11 || Orioles || 13–8 || Mujica (1–1) || Cherry (0–1) || || 23,408 || 53–64
|-  style="text-align:center; background:#bfb;"
| 118 || August 12 || Orioles || 7–5 || Perez (2–2) || Johnson (2–4) || Lewis (2) || 21,143 || 54–64
|-  style="text-align:center; background:#fbb;"
| 119 || August 13 || Orioles || 6–1 || Guthrie (10–8) || Reyes (1–1) || || 21,299 || 54–65
|-  style="text-align:center; background:#fbb;"
| 120 || August 14 || Orioles || 11–6 || Cabrera (1–1) || Perez (2–3) || || 22,140 || 54–66
|-  style="text-align:center; background:#bfb;"
| 121 || August 15 || Angels || 3–2 || Lee (17–2) || Arredondo (4–1) || || 30,962 || 55–66
|-  style="text-align:center; background:#fbb;"
| 122 || August 16 || Angels || 4–3 || Lackey (10–2) || Carmona (5–5) || Rodríguez (47) || 33,051 || 55–67
|-  style="text-align:center; background:#bfb;"
| 123 || August 17 || Angels || 4–3 || Sowers (2–6) || Speier (1–6) || Lewis (3) || 28,356 || 56–67
|-  style="text-align:center; background:#bfb;"
| 124 || August 19 || Royals || 9–4 || Reyes (2–1) || Hochevar (6–12) || || 18,946 || 57–67
|-  style="text-align:center; background:#bfb;"
| 125 || August 20 || Royals || 8–5 || Rincón (1–1) || Soria (1–3) || Lewis (4) || 23,920 || 58–67
|-  style="text-align:center; background:#bfb;"
| 126 || August 21 || Royals || 10–3 || Lee (18–2) || Greinke (9–9) || || 21,391 || 59–67
|-  style="text-align:center; background:#bfb;"
| 127 || August 22 || @ Rangers || 7–5 || Carmona (6–5) || Harrison (5–3) || Lewis (5) || 20,535 || 60–67
|-  style="text-align:center; background:#bfb;"
| 128 || August 23 || @ Rangers || 8–7 || Perez (3–3) || Wright (6–5) || Lewis (6) || 29,900 || 61–67
|-  style="text-align:center; background:#bfb;"
| 129 || August 24 || @ Rangers || 4–3 || Betancourt (3–4) || Guardado (3–3) || || 14,956 || 62–67
|-  style="text-align:center; background:#bfb;"
| 130 || August 25 || @ Tigers || 4 – 3 (10) || Donnelly (1–0) || Glover (1–3) || Lewis (7) || 39,196 || 63–67
|-  style="text-align:center; background:#bfb;"
| 131 || August 26 || @ Tigers || 10–4 || Lee (19–2) || Lambert (0–1) || || 38,774 || 64–67
|-  style="text-align:center; background:#bfb;"
| 132 || August 27 || @ Tigers || 9–7 || Carmona (7–5) || Verlander (10–14) || || 38,519 || 65–67
|-  style="text-align:center; background:#fbb;"
| 133 || August 29 || Mariners || 3–2 || Hernández (9–8) || Sowers (2–7) || Putz (10) || 26,047 || 65–68
|-  style="text-align:center; background:#fbb;"
| 134 || August 30 || Mariners || 4 – 3 (10) || Putz (6–4) || Lewis (0–4) || Messenger (1) || 33,387 || 65–69
|-  style="text-align:center; background:#fbb;"
| 135 || August 31 || Mariners || 6–4 || Rowland-Smith (4–2) || Jackson (0–1) || Corcoran (2) || 35,376 || 65–70
|-

|-  style="text-align:center; background:#bfb;"
| 136 || September 1 || White Sox || 5–0 || Lee (20–2) || Richard (2–3) || || 23,317 || 66–70
|-  style="text-align:center; background:#bfb;"
| 137 || September 2 || White Sox || 9–3 || Carmona (8–5) || Danks (10–8) || || 20,980 || 67–70
|-  style="text-align:center; background:#fbb;"
| 138 || September 3 || White Sox || 4–2 || Vázquez (11–12) || Sowers (2–8) || Jenks (28) || 20,328 || 67–71
|-  style="text-align:center; background:#bfb;"
| 139 || September 5 || @ Royals || 9–3 || Mujica (2–1) || Duckworth (2–1) || || 21,107 || 68–71
|-  style="text-align:center; background:#fbb;"
| 140 || September 6 || @ Royals || 3–1 || Meche (11–10) || Jackson (0–2) || Soria (35) || 18,795 || 68–72
|-  style="text-align:center; background:#bfb;"
| 141 || September 7 || @ Royals || 3–1 || Lee (21–2) || Greinke (10–10) || Lewis (8) || 15,023 || 69–72
|-  style="text-align:center; background:#fbb;"
| 142 || September 8 || @ Orioles || 14–3 || Olson (9–7) || Carmona (8–6) || || 11,181 || 69–73
|-  style="text-align:center; background:#bfb;"
| 143 || September 9 || @ Orioles || 6–1 || Sowers (3–8) || Liz (5–5) || || 14,900 || 70–73
|-  style="text-align:center; background:#bfb;"
| 144 || September 10 || @ Orioles || 7–1 || Lewis (1–0) || Waters (2–3) || || 12,438 || 71–73
|-  style="text-align:center; background:#fbb;"
| 145 || September 11 || @ Orioles || 6–3 || Cormier (3–3) || Jackson (0–3) || Miller (1) || 12,526 || 71–74
|-  style="text-align:center; background:#bfb;"
| 146 || September 12 || Royals || 12–5 || Lee (22–2) || Meche (11–11) || || 32,843  || 72–74
|-  style="text-align:center; background:#fbb;"
| 147 || September 13 || Royals || 8–3 || Greinke (11–10) || Carmona (8–7) || || 25,783 || 72–75
|-  style="text-align:center; background:#fbb;"
| 148 || September 13 || Royals || 8–4 || Tejeda (2–2) || Bullington (0–1) || Soria (37) || 25,485 || 72–76
|-  style="text-align:center; background:#fbb;"
| 149 || September 14 || Royals || 13–3 || Bannister (8–15) || Mujica (2–2) || || 29,530 || 72–77
|-  style="text-align:center; background:#bfb;"
| 150 || September 15 || Twins || 3–1 || Lewis (2–0) || Slowey (12–10) || Lewis (9) || 19,607 || 73–77
|-  style="text-align:center; background:#bfb;"
| 151 || September 16 || Twins || 12 – 9 (11) || Mastny (2–2) || Nathan (0–2) || || 21,295 || 74–77
|-  style="text-align:center; background:#bfb;"
| 152 || September 17 || Twins || 6–4 || Mujica (3–2) || Mijares (0–1) || Lewis (10) || 22,904 || 75–77
|-  style="text-align:center; background:#bfb;"
| 153 || September 19 || Tigers || 6–5 || Perez (4–3) || Dolsi (1–5) || || 33,733 || 76–77
|-  style="text-align:center; background:#bfb;"
| 154 || September 20 || Tigers || 6–3 || Sowers (4–8) || Verlander (10–17) || Lewis (11) || 36,869 || 77–77
|-  style="text-align:center; background:#bfb;"
| 155 || September 21 || Tigers || 10–5 || Lewis (3–0) || Willis (0–2) || || 36,957 || 78–77
|-  style="text-align:center; background:#bfb;"
| 156 || September 22 || @ Red Sox || 4–3 || Jackson (1–3) || Beckett (12–10) || Lewis (12) || 37,828 || 79–77
|-  style="text-align:center; background:#fbb;"
| 157 || September 23 || @ Red Sox || 5–4 || Wakefield (10–11) || Lee (22–3) || Papelbon (41) || 37,882 || 79–78
|-  style="text-align:center; background:#fbb;"
| 158 || September 24 || @ Red Sox || 5–4 || Aardsma (4–2) || Perez (4–4) || Delcarmen (2) || 37,719 || 79–79
|-  style="text-align:center; background:#fbb;"
| 159 || September 25 || @ Red Sox || 6–1 || Lester (16–6) || Sowers (4–9) || || 37,726 || 79–80
|-  style="text-align:center; background:#bfb;"
| 160 || September 26 || @ White Sox || 11–8 || Lewis (4–0) || Danks (11–9) || Lewis (13) || 36,494 || 80–80
|-  style="text-align:center; background:#bfb;"
| 161 || September 27 || @ White Sox || 12–6 || Jackson (2–3) || Vázquez (12–16) || ||36,031 || 81–80
|-  style="text-align:center; background:#fbb;"
| 162 || September 28 || @ White Sox || 5–1 || Buehrle (15–12) || Bullington (0–2) || || 33,396 || 81–81
|-

Roster

Player stats

Batting
Note: G = Games played; AB = At bats; R = Runs scored; H = Hits; 2B = Doubles; 3B = Triples; HR = Home runs; RBI = Runs batted in; AVG = Batting average; SB = Stolen bases

Pitching
Note: W = Wins; L = Losses; ERA = Earned run average; G = Games pitched; GS = Games started; SV = Saves; IP = Innings pitched; H = Hits allowed; R = Runs allowed; ER = Earned runs allowed; BB = Walks allowed; K = Strikeouts

Minor league affiliates

References

External links

 2008 Cleveland Indians season at Baseball Reference

Cleveland Indians
Cleveland Guardians seasons
Cleve